Şengül is a Turkish surname. Notable people with the surname include:

 Onur Şengül (born 1979), Turkish bass player
 Sabriye Şengül (born 1988), Turkish female boxer, kickboxer and mixed martial artist
 Yağmur Şengül (born 1994), Turkish female para archer
 Ziya Şengül (born 1944), Turkish footballer

See also
 Şengül, Tercan

Turkish-language surnames